Justice Durham may refer to:

Christine M. Durham, associate justice of the Utah Supreme Court
Robert D. Durham, associate justice of the Oregon Supreme Court